Sultanabad is a multiethnic katchi abadi, or unplanned settlement, in central Karachi, Pakistan.

The Majority of  people in Sultanabad belong to Pashtoon Community, and many Pashtun migrated to the area following military operations in the tribal areas in the 2010s. People from Hindko, Sindhi & Seraiki communities also live there. Sultanabad is a way to industrial, economical and business area of Karachi where P.I.D.C (Pakistan Industrial Development Corporation), hotels PC and Movinpick are just near of it It has one of the well known educational system Habib Public School.

References

External links 
 Karachi Website.

Neighbourhoods of Karachi
Kiamari Town
Squatting in Pakistan

Sultanabad
سلطان آباد
Karachi, Karachi City, Sindh
Pakistan